South Korean girl group T-ara debuted in 2009 with the single "Lies". In 2010, T-ara became the main cast of Mnet's reality program Hello Baby in its second season. The show earned the group an award at the 2011 Cable TV Broadcasting Awards.

Music videos

Video albums

Filmography

Films

Television series

Web series

Television shows

Web Shows

Advertising

See also

 T-ara discography
 List of awards and nominations received by T-ara

Notes

References

Videography
Videographies of South Korean artists